In 1978, prior to the start of the second season of World Series Cricket, the WSC Australia XI and WSC World XI teams embarked on a brief tour of New Zealand, the first time that WSC teams had played outside Australia. A four-day game played in Auckland was to be followed by a three-day single innings game and a total of six one day games between the two sides over a 16-day period. The abandonment of the third one-day game led to the scheduling of an additional game at the same venue later in the tour. The planned three-day game became a pair of one-day games after the first day was washed out, which led to a final total of nine one-day games on the schedule.

Itinerary

Four Day Game

Three Day Game

ODI Series

1st ODI

2nd ODI

3rd ODI

4th ODI

5th ODI

6th ODI

7th ODI

8th ODI

9th ODI

External links
World Series Cricket in New Zealand 1978 – ESPNCricinfo

1978 in New Zealand cricket
International cricket competitions from 1975–76 to 1980
Multi-national cricket tours of New Zealand
New Zealand cricket seasons from 1970–71 to 1999–2000
World Series Cricket